Rathva is a surname. Notable people with the surname include:

Amarsinh Rathawa(1977-1989) Member of Parliament, Lok Sabha
Naranbhai Rathwa (2004-2009) Indian Minister of State for Railways
Gitaben Rathva ( member of parliament ) Political party  Bharatiya Janata Party
Ninad Rathva Indian cricketer,Baroda in the 2017–18 Ranji Trophy 
  Mohansinh Chhotubhai Rathava an Indian politician
Sukhram Rathva an Indian National Congress politician from the state of Gujarat, India.
 Ramsinh Rathwa  is Indian politician from Gujarat and belong to Bhartiya Janata Party.

References

Agricultural castes
Gujarati people